Pelican Narrows is a summer village in Alberta, Canada. Located on the western shore of Moose Lake, south of Moose Lake Provincial Park, it is connected to Bonnyville by Highway 28.

Demographics 

In the 2016 Census of Population conducted by Statistics Canada, the Summer Village of Pelican Narrows had a population of 151 living in 54 of its 65 total private dwellings, a  change from its 2011 population of 162.

See also 
List of communities in Alberta
List of summer villages in Alberta
List of resort villages in Saskatchewan

References

External links 

1979 establishments in Alberta
Summer villages in Alberta